Rowley Burn can refer to:
 Rowley Burn (Northumberland), tributary of Devil's Water
 Rowley Burn (County Durham), tributary of the River Deerness